Prestwood F.C. are a football club based in Prestwood, near High Wycombe, England. They currently play in the Aylesbury & District League Premier Division. The club is affiliated to the Berks & Bucks Football Association

History
The club was founded in 1934. The club were founder members of the Wycombe Senior League
In 1984 they became founding members of the Chiltonian League.  When the Chiltonian league merged with the Hellenic League in 2000, they joined Division One East.

For nine seasons they stayed in the Hellenic league, until midway during their tenth campaign, the 2009–10 season. In November 2009 the club resigned from the league, stating that they did not have enough players or finances to continue the rest of the league season. The club believed the cause of this problem was the new clubhouse built by the District Council that removed the hospitality functions they had with the old club house, so finding it hard to maintain a club spirit and the new sports ground not letting them do fund raising activities anymore.

In the 2010–11 season the club joined the Wycombe & District League Senior Section, where they have remained until the end of last season. For the season 2019–20 the First Team will play in the Aylesbury & District Premier League and the reserves will play in the ADL Division 2

Ground

Prestwood home is Sprinters Leisure Centre, Honor End Lane HP16 9QY.

Honours

League honours

Princess Risborough & District League:
 Winners 1935-36
Wycombe & District League:
 League division two winners 1938-39
 League champions 1951-1952
 League champions 1981-1982
 League runners up: 1982–83, 2011–12
 League champions: 2016-17, 2017-18

Cup honours
Chalfont & Gerrards Cross Cup:
 Runners up 1949-1950
Chesham Charity Cup:
 Winners     1951-1952
 Runners up  1953-1954
 Winners     2001-2002
Reading Junior Cup:
 Runners up 1971-1972
Wycombe Senior Cup:
 Runners up 1954-1955
 Runners up 1980-1981  
 Runners up 2003-2004
WDFL
Tom Hooker League Cup Winners 2015-16
Reserve Cup winners           2016-17
Aylesbury & District Football League
Marsworth Reserve Cup Winners 2018-19

Records

Highest League Position: 8th in Hellenic Division One East 2001–02
Top Goalscorer:
Highest attendance: V Turner Sports 2000

References

External links
 

Hellenic Football League
Football clubs in Buckinghamshire
1934 establishments in England
Association football clubs established in 1934
Football clubs in England